Argentine Sign Language (Spanish: Lengua de señas argentina; LSA) is used in Argentina. Deaf people attend separate schools, and use local sign languages out of class. A manual alphabet for spelling Spanish has been developed.

References

External links
LSA dictionaries 

Sign languages
Languages of Argentina